"Throw It Back" is a song recorded by American rapper Missy Elliott for her first extended play Iconology (2019). The song was released as EP's lead single on August 23, 2019.

Composition
"Throw It Back" was written by Elliott, Quintin Ernest Talbet, Michael Aristotle, and William Jared Buggs, while production was handled by Willi Hendrix. Musically, "Throw It Back" has been described as a "woozy, futuristic romp" containing "distorted bass lines", frenetic production", and trap snares. Lyrically, "Throw It Back" contains references to Elliott's history, as well as previous collaborators Tweet and Heavy D, and Elliott's 2002 single "Work It".

Critical reception
Jordan Darville of The Fader, named "Throw It Back" "the standout track" from Iconology.

Music video
A music video for "Throw It Back" was released alongside Iconology. It contains a guest appearance from Teyana Taylor. The video begins with a young girl waking up in an museum with paintings of the rapper. After entering a foggy room, Elliott appears with several dancers and cheerleaders in colorful outfits and afros. The video also contains references to Elliott's career, similar to the lyrical content.  Anika Reed of USA Today described the video as "[shwoing] Elliott's unwavering authenticity" and "celebrating blackness". Katherine J. Igoe, writing for Marie Claire, called the video "a complete return to form" for Elliott.

Personnel
Adapted from Iconology's liner notes.
Missy Elliott – lead artist, songwriter
Michael Aristotle – songwriter
Quintin Ernest Talbert – songwriter
Wili Hendrix – production
Chris Godbey – engineering
Glenn Schick – mastering
Finis "KY" White – mixing

Charts

Release history

References

2019 singles
2019 songs
Missy Elliott songs
Songs written by Missy Elliott
Music videos directed by Dave Meyers (director)